Swingin' with Bud is a studio album by jazz pianist Bud Powell, released in 1958 by RCA Victor, featuring a session Powell recorded in 1957.

The album was released on CD by RCA in 1995. The session is also available on The Complete RCA Trio Sessions.

Track listing
All songs were written by Bud Powell, except where noted.
"Another Dozen" (George Duvivier) – 3:30
"Like Someone in Love" (Jimmy Van Heusen, Johnny Burke) – 4:59
"Salt Peanuts" (Dizzy Gillespie, Kenny Clarke) – 2:24
"She" (George Shearing) – 5:11
"Swedish Pastry" (Barney Kessel) – 3:19

"Shaw 'Nuff" (Gillespie) – 3:18
"Oblivion" – 2:34
"In the Blue of the Evening" (Alfonso D'Artega, Tom Adair) – 3:27
"Get It" – 3:08
"Birdland Blues" – 4:22
"Midway" – 3:09

Personnel
February 11, 1957, New York. The Bud Powell Trio.

Performance
Bud Powell – piano
George Duvivier – bass
Art Taylor – drums

Production
Burt Goldblatt – cover design & photo

References

Bud Powell albums
1958 albums
RCA Victor albums